MocoSpace is a mobile social network. The features of the site are similar to other social networking sites. Features include mobile games, chat, instant messaging, eCards, and photos. Mocospace was created during the popularity of and based on Myspace.com.

Venture funding for start up companies in the mobile space expanded rapidly starting in 2005, and MocoSpace was a beneficiary of this trend. In 2007, MocoSpace received an initial $3 million series A round of venture funding. And in January 2008 MocoSpace received a $4 million series B round of funding. At that time, MocoSpace also announced 2 million registered users and 1 billion monthly page views. Like most social networking services, the business model is based on serving advertisements to users.

See also 
 List of social networking websites

References

External links 
 Official website
 iPhone App on iTunes
 Android App on Google Play

American social networking websites
Companies based in Boston
Software companies based in Massachusetts
Internet properties established in 2005
Software companies of the United States
2005 establishments in the United States
2005 establishments in Massachusetts
Software companies established in 2005
Companies established in 2005